Lars Erik Oskar Fallenius (born 1 November 2001) is a Swedish professional footballer who plays for Djurgårdens IF as a winger.

Career

Brommapojkarna
Raised in Nynäshamn with his father, and having a mother living in Vallentuna, Fallenius started his footballing career with IF Brommapojkarna in 2012. In the summer of 2014, Fallenius played against Juventus in the final of a European youth tournament.

On 29 November 2018, Fallenius signed his first professional contract and was promoted to the first-team squad of Brommapojkarna for the 2019 Superettan season. He made his Superettan debut on 7 April 2019 in a 4–0 win over Dalkurd FF, coming on as a substitute in the 80th minute for Albin Linnér.

Brøndby
On 4 January 2021, it was announced that Fallenius had signed with Danish Superliga club Brøndby IF on a three-and-a-half year deal. He made his debut for the club on 4 March, coming on as a half-time substitute for Michael Lumb in a 0–0 draw against Randers.

On 23 September 2021, Fallenius scored his first goal for the club in an 8–1 win over Allerød FK in the Danish Cup third round. In the following round of the cup, he managed to score his second goal as Brøndby beat Aalborg Freja 3–0 at Aalborg Portland Park.

Loan to Start
On 31 March 2022, Fallenius was sent on loan to Norwegian First Division club Start for one season, with an option for him to return to Brøndby in the summer of 2022. He made his debut on 4 April in a 5–1 win over Åsane, impressing by scoring a brace and providing one assist to Jonatan Braut Brunes, the first cousin of star striker Erling Haaland, who scored a hat-trick. In July 2022, Fallenius got injured and was set to be out for three month. A month later, on 5 August 2022, Brøndby re-called him, so he could focus on his rehabilitation.

Honours
Brøndby
 Danish Superliga: 2020–21

References

External links
 
 
 

2001 births
Living people
People from Nynäshamn Municipality
Swedish footballers
Swedish expatriate footballers
Sweden youth international footballers
IF Brommapojkarna players
Brøndby IF players
IK Start players
Djurgårdens IF Fotboll players
Association football midfielders
Allsvenskan players
Superettan players
Ettan Fotboll players
Danish Superliga players
Expatriate men's footballers in Denmark
Swedish expatriate sportspeople in Denmark
Norwegian First Division players
Expatriate footballers in Norway
Swedish expatriate sportspeople in Norway
Sportspeople from Stockholm County